Mark Carwardine (IPA: /kɑːwɑːdiːn/; born 9 March 1959) is a British zoologist who achieved widespread recognition with his 20-year conservation project – Last Chance to See – which involved round-the-world expeditions with Douglas Adams and Stephen Fry. The first series was aired on BBC Radio 4 in 1990, and the second, a TV series, on BBC2 in 2009. There are two books about the project: Last Chance to See, which he co-wrote with Adams (1990), and Last Chance to See: In the footsteps of Douglas Adams (2009). He is a leading and outspoken conservationist, and a prolific broadcaster, columnist and photographer.

Writing
Carwardine has written more than fifty books. Most recently he has written the ground-breaking Handbook of Whales, Dolphins and Porpoises (Bloomsbury 2019) and wildlife photography eBooks (2020). In 2009, he wrote Last Chance to See: In the Footsteps of Douglas Adams (HarperCollins). This is a sequel to the best-selling book, Last Chance to See, which he wrote with the late Douglas Adams (author of The Hitchhiker's Guide to the Galaxy). A new edition was published in 2020 to celebrate its thirtieth anniversary. Other books that Carwardine has written include Mark Carwardine's Guide to Whale Watching in North America (Bloomsbury, 2017), Mark Carwardine's Guide to Whale Watching in Britain and Europe (Bloomsbury, 2016), the award-winning Shark Watcher's Handbook and Eyewitness Handbooks: Whales, Dolphins and Porpoises, which is the best-selling cetacean field guide ever published (nearly a million copies in print). Carwardine also writes a monthly column in BBC Wildlife magazine, and has written hundreds of articles for newspapers and magazines.

Radio and television
In 1989 the BBC Radio 4 series Last Chance to See and the subsequent book (1990) described eight expeditions by Carwardine and writer Douglas Adams to find and report on some of the most endangered species around the world. These were the aye-aye in Madagascar, the Komodo dragon in Indonesia, the kakapo in New Zealand, the Amazonian manatee in Brazil, the Yangtze river dolphin in China, the Juan Fernández fur seal in Chile, the northern white rhino in the Democratic Republic of the Congo, and the Rodrigues fruit bat in Mauritius.

Carwardine also presented the weekly half-hour radio programme Nature, on BBC Radio 4, for many years. He has also been the presenter of many other programmes for BBC Radio 4.

In autumn 2009, he joined forces with Stephen Fry to present a follow-up to the original Last Chance to See with the late Douglas Adams. This was the six-part BBC2 television series, also called Last Chance to See, which concerned the very same endangered species as in the original and how they have fared twenty years on. The series not only updated the situation with most of the endangered species featured in the original series but looked at some new ones, including the blue whale in Baja California, Mexico.

In spring 2010, he co-presented The Museum of Life (BBC2, 6 episodes), which explored the pioneering and often surprising research work and wildlife collections of the Natural History Museum, in London.

On BBC2 in October 2010 there was an additional Last Chance to See special by Carwardine and Fry about the northern white rhino, Last Chance to See: Return of the Rhino, which followed the re-introduction of zoo-raised rhinos into the wild.

Also on BBC2 on 7 November 2010 Carwardine and Fry co-presented Stephen Fry and the Great American Oil Spill about the effects, four months after the BP oil disaster in the Gulf of Mexico.

Photography
Carwardine has an extensive collection of wildlife, nature and environment photographs taken on all seven continents and in more than a hundred countries. He wrote two eBooks in 2020 (Wildlife Photography Masterclass: Digital Workflow and Wildlife Photography Masterclass: Camera Settings). He was also Chairman of the judging panel for the prestigious Wildlife Photographer of the Year competition for seven years since 2005, run by the Natural History Museum and BBC Wildlife.

Wildlife tours
Carwardine was a founding director of the wildlife travel company Discover the World. He now runs his new travel company, The Whale Watch Company www.whalewatchcompany.com, specialising in whale-watching tours including to Baja California, Mexico, four times a year, ship charters to the Arctic and Antarctic, and occasionally leading specialist wildlife photography trips.

Last Chance to See kakapo incident
In 2009, Carwardine and television presenter Stephen Fry visited Codfish Island in New Zealand as part of a series for the Last Chance to See, focusing on endangered species around the world. While they were filming a kakapo male called Sirocco, the bird hopped onto Carwardine's head and attempted to mate with him. The scene itself and Fry's commentary, "Sorry, but this is one of the funniest things I've ever seen. You are being shagged by a rare parrot", proved an instant television hit, being featured on news items around the world.

A video of the incident was uploaded to YouTube, where it received more than 700,000 views in the first week. As of January 2021 it has been viewed more than 22 million times.

Selected bibliography 
Carwardine has written more than 50 books, including the following:
Wildlife Photography Masterclass: Camera Settings (eBook, self-published 2020)
Wildlife Photography Masterclass: Digital Workflow (eBook, self-published 2020) 
Handbook of Whales, Dolphins and Porpoises  (Bloomsbury 2020) 
Mark Carwardine's Guide to Whale Watching in North America  (Bloomsbury 2017) 
Mark Carwardine's Guide to Whale Watching in Britain and Europe  second edition (Bloomsbury 2016) 
Mark Carwardine's Ultimate Wildlife Experiences, with foreword by Stephen Fry (Wanderlust Publications, 2011) 
Last Chance to See, with Douglas Adams first published 1990 by William Heinemann (Arrow Books, 2009, 2nd edition, 2020 3rd edition) 
Last Chance to See: In the footsteps of Douglas Adams, with foreword by Stephen Fry (HarperCollins, 2009)  
 Natural History Museum Animal Records (Natural History Museum, 2007) 
 Collins Wild Guide: Whales & Dolphins (HarperCollins, 2006) 
Extreme Nature, with Rosamund Kidman Cox (HarperCollins, 2005) 
Shark (BBC Books, 2004) 
Mark Carwardine's Guide to Whalewatching: Britain and Europe (New Holland Publishers, 2003) 
The Shark Watcher's Handbook: A guide to sharks and where to see them, with Ken Watterson (BBC Books, 2002) 
Killer Whales (BBC Books, 2001) 
The Guinness Book of Animal Records (Guinness Publishing, 1995) 
Eyewitness Handbooks: Whales, Dolphins and Porpoises (Dorling Kindersley, 1995) 
On the Trail of the Whale with foreword by Paul McCartney (Thunder Bay Publishing Co, 1994) 
Last Chance to See, with Douglas Adams (Pan Books, 1991) 
Birds in Focus (Salamander, 1990) 
The Encyclopedia of World Wildlife with foreword by David Attenborough (Octopus Publishing, 1986) 
The Nature of Zimbabwe: A guide to conservation and development issues (IUCN,1988) 
The Nature of Zambia: A guide to conservation and development issues (IUCN, 1988) 
The Nature of Pakistan: A guide to conservation and development issues (IUCN,1986) 
Iceland: Nature's Meeting Place, with foreword by the President of Iceland (Iceland Review, 1986)

References

External links

 Carwardine's official website
 Mark Carwardine on the Eden website
 Radio 4 Nature "listen again" to episodes, circa 2003, presented by Carwardine, in RealAudio format.
 Radio 4 'Tough Lives'  "listen again" to a series presented by Carwardine, in RealAudio format.
 Stephen Fry's blog 17 October 2008

British naturalists
British zoologists
1959 births
Living people
Non-fiction environmental writers
British conservationists